Spergo is a genus of sea snails, marine gastropod mollusks in the family Raphitomidae.

Description
The large, thin shell is nearly destitute of sculpture. It shows an unrecurved columella, a short, wide, straight siphonal canal, a wide shallow emargination representing the anal notch, and generally feeble anal fasciole, except in the very young. There is a sharp outer lip, unarmed aperture, and a sinusigera protoconch.
 
The animal has a muzzle formed by a stout squarely truncated rostrum opening into a capacious pharynx, provided internally with a degenerate proboscis not capable of extrusion beyond the oral orifice, with a poison gland and a degenerate radula. Eyes are present and functional. The tentacles are low-seated, stout, and clavate. The operculum is absent. The dentition resembles that of Bela.

This form resembles Pleurotomella, Verrill, from which it differs in the character of the rostrum and pharynx, in the possession of eyes, in its straight wide siphonal canal, and in having a feebler type of verge, anal notch and fasciole.

Species
Species within the genus Spergo include:
 Spergo aithorrhis Sysoev & Bouchet, 2001
 Spergo annulata Criscione, Hallan, Puillandre & Fedosov, 2021
 Spergo castellum Criscione, Hallan, Puillandre & Fedosov, 2021
 Spergo fusiformis (Habe, 1962)
 Spergo glandiniformis (Dall, 1895)
 Spergo nipponensis Okutani & Iwahori, 1992
 Spergo parunculis Stahlschmidt, Chino & Fraussen, 2015
 Spergo parvidentata Criscione, Hallan, Puillandre & Fedosov, 2021
 Spergo sibogae Schepman, 1913
 Spergo tenuiconcha Criscione, Hallan, Puillandre & Fedosov, 2021
Species brought into synonymy
 Spergo glandiformis (Dall, 1895): synonym of Spergo glandiniformis (Dall, 1895) (misspelling)

References

 Bouchet P. & Rocroi J.-P. (2010). Nomenclator of Molluscan Supraspecific Names.

External links
  Bouchet, P.; Kantor, Y. I.; Sysoev, A.; Puillandre, N. (2011). A new operational classification of the Conoidea (Gastropoda). Journal of Molluscan Studies. 77(3): 273-308
 
 Worldwide Mollusc Species Data Base: Raphitomidae

 
Raphitomidae
Gastropod genera